Ahmad Reza Zendeh Rouh is an Iranian football winger who plays for Gol Gohar Sirjan in the Persian Gulf Pro League.

Career
Zendeh Rouh has played his entire career with Mes Kerman.

Club career statistics
Last Update:  6 August 2018

International career

U 22

He was called up by Ali Reza Mansourian to participate in the team's training camp in Italy.

References

External links 
Ahmad Reza Zendeh Rouh at PersianLeague.com

Iranian footballers
Association football defenders
Sanat Mes Kerman F.C. players
1992 births
Living people
People from Kerman